The Aowin, along with the Denkyira and Akwamu were among the three original great Akan Empires.  Prior to the rise of the Denkyira state, the Aowin (Ebrosa) was the most powerful state in what is now Ghana's south-western region. Originally a gold producing state they dominated the trade between the Savannah regions of west Africa and the coastal regions later focusing their trade on the coast.

Like many Akans the Aowin are believed to have originated further up north eventually  settling in Bonoman and then migrating from there to their present location due to several existential forces: Namely, the Denkyira and Ashanti, who after decades of war gained control of the Aowin state during various periods of time
.  Even when under occupation the Aowin continued to wield significant power and remained relatively independent as a powerful gold producing Akan state with relative  military superiority over neighbors.

References 

Ethnic groups in Ivory Coast